Henry Larssen (24 May 1871  – ) was a Norwegian judge.

He was born in Drammen to Hans Larssen and Caroline Caspersen. He graduated as cand.jur. in 1893, and was named as a Supreme Court Justice from 1922 to 1947.

References

1871 births
Year of death missing
People from Drammen
Supreme Court of Norway justices